Forollhogna (or Forolhogna) is a mountain located on the border between three municipalities in Norway: Midtre Gauldal and Holtålen (in Trøndelag county) and Os (in Innlandet county).

References

Mountains of Innlandet
Mountains of Trøndelag
Midtre Gauldal
Holtålen
Os, Innlandet